Jung Moon-sung (Korean: 정문성; born January 13, 1981) is a South Korean actor. He is perhaps best known for his role in Hospital Playlist (2020–2021), Miracle: Letters to the President (2021) and The Veil (2021). He is also famous for his role helper robot Oliver in Musical Maybe Happy Ending (2016).

Filmography

Film

Television series

Web series

Theater

Awards and nominations

References

External links 

 

Living people
21st-century South Korean male actors
South Korean male television actors
South Korean television personalities
South Korean male film actors
South Korean male web series actors
1981 births